Kellison is a surname. It may refer to the following notable people:
Daniel Kellison (born 1964), American television and film producer
John Kellison (1886–1971), American football player, athletic director, and college sports coach
Matthew Kellison (c. 1560–1642), English Roman Catholic theologian and controversialist